Ian Mortimer (born 13 March 1983) is a Canadian sprint canoer who has competed in the World Canoe Championships and trains with the sprint canoe national team of Canada. Mortimer is a member of the Rideau Canoe Club in Ottawa, Ontario, along with his brother Angus, who is also a national team member, but in kayaking.

Mortimer competed for Team Canada at the 2005 ICF Flatwater Racing World Championships, in Zagreb, Croatia, where his team finished fifth in the four-man 1000 meter event, four tenths of a second from the bronze medal, and ninth in the four-man 500 meter event. He has also won a gold medal at the Canadian Junior Championship (two-man 500 meter), and won a World Cup event in Rezice during the 2004 season.

See also
List of canoe/kayak athletes by country

External links
The roster for the 2005-2006 Canadian Sprint Canoe and Kayak Team
Brief bio
2005 ICF Flatwater Racing World Championship results , PDF file

1983 births
Canadian male canoeists
Living people
Pan American Games bronze medalists for Canada
Pan American Games medalists in canoeing
Canoeists at the 2003 Pan American Games
Medalists at the 2003 Pan American Games